Viktor Hrebennykov (born 17 March 1986) is a Ukrainian rower. He competed in the Men's eight event at the 2012 Summer Olympics and placed 8th.

References

External links
 

1986 births
Living people
Ukrainian male rowers
Olympic rowers of Ukraine
Rowers at the 2012 Summer Olympics
Sportspeople from Mykolaiv